Sassi Punnu is a 1958 Pakistani film adapted from a popular Sindhi folk tale, produced by Syed A. Haroon, directed by Akbar Ali. It was released on 30 May 1958 and starred Nighat Sultana, Sayani and Rakhshi. This is a black and white film in Sindhi language.

See also
 Sassui Punnhun
 Sindhi folklore
 Sindhi cinema
 List of Sindhi-language films
 Sassi Punno- A Pakistani Urdu language film released in 2004

Further reading
 Gazdar, Mushtaq. 1997. Pakistan Cinema, 1947-1997. Karachi: Oxford University Press.

References

Sindhi-language films
Pakistani romance films
1958 films
Pakistani black-and-white films